Kageronia is a genus of mayflies in the family Heptageniidae.

References

Mayflies
Mayfly genera
Insects of Europe